Peter Wenzel (born 15 April 1952) is a retired East German weightlifter who won a bronze medal in the middleweight category at the 1976 Summer Olympics. Between 1973 and 1979 he won a medal at every world championship, including a gold in 1975.

References

1952 births
Living people
German male weightlifters
Olympic weightlifters of East Germany
Weightlifters at the 1976 Summer Olympics
Olympic bronze medalists for East Germany
Olympic medalists in weightlifting
Medalists at the 1976 Summer Olympics